John Jay Caufield (born July 17, 1960) is an American former NHL right winger. Caufield was born in Philadelphia, Pennsylvania, and was raised in the Towamencin Township, Pennsylvania, area about a mile outside Lansdale borough. He graduated from North Penn High School.

Playing career
During the 1979-80 hockey season, Caufield played junior hockey for the Milton Flyers of the OHA-B. The next season, he later attended Hibbing Community College, where he played hockey.  Following the season, Caufield went to the University of North Dakota, where he played football and one hockey game during the 1984–85 season. He later signed with the New York Rangers in 1985 and was assigned to the Toledo Goaldiggers of the IHL.

Caufield played 13 games with the Rangers in the 1986–87 season, accumulating 45 penalty minutes.

The Rangers traded Caufield prior to the 1987–88 season, when he played 65 games for the Kalamazoo Wings.

With the Pittsburgh Penguins, Caufield played most of five seasons, including on their 1991–92 Stanley Cup-winning team. He averaged nearly four penalty minutes a game, and in 194 games with Pittsburgh he scored three goals. He was demoted to the IHL for 1993–94 and retired at the end of the season.

Career statistics

Later life
After he retired as a hockey player, Caufield made a brief appearance as the Penguins' goalie, Brad Tolliver, in the hockey-themed action film Sudden Death. He also became a personal trainer, working extensively with Mario Lemieux during his NHL comebacks. Currently, Caufield works as an analyst on Penguins Pregame & Postgame on AT&T SportsNet Pittsburgh.

Awards and achievements
1991 and 1992 Stanley Cup championships (with Pittsburgh)

References

External links

1960 births
American men's ice hockey right wingers
Ice hockey players from Pennsylvania
Kalamazoo Wings (1974–2000) players
Living people
Minnesota North Stars players
Muskegon Lumberjacks players
New Haven Nighthawks players
New York Rangers players
North Dakota Fighting Hawks men's ice hockey players
Sportspeople from Philadelphia
Pittsburgh Penguins players
Stanley Cup champions
Undrafted National Hockey League players
People from Towamencin Township, Montgomery County, Pennsylvania
People from Lansdale, Pennsylvania
North Dakota Fighting Hawks football players